Henry Minard Willegale (June 9, 1901 – June 26, 1964) was a player in the National Football League for the Minneapolis Red Jackets in 1929. He played at the collegiate level at Carleton College.

Biography
Willegale was born on June 9, 1901 in Madison, Wisconsin. He died in Minneapolis in 1964.

References

1901 births
1964 deaths
Sportspeople from Madison, Wisconsin
Players of American football from Wisconsin
American football halfbacks
American football fullbacks
Carleton Knights football players
Minneapolis Red Jackets players